The Eagle Aircraft 150 is an Australian designed two-seat single-engine composite material training, touring and sport aircraft. It utilizes a three lifting surface design consisting of a forward wing (foreplane), main wing (mainplane) and horizontal stabilizer (tailplane). The aircraft was designed and originally built by Eagle Aircraft Pty Ltd, but is now manufactured in Malaysia by Composites Technology Research Malaysia (CTRM).

Design and development
The Eagle 150B is a development of the Eagle X-TS from Western Australian inventors Neil Graham and his father Deryck Graham. Australian aeronautical engineer Graham Swannell and American aerodynamicist John Roncz were then engaged to design an aircraft to meet then-current JAR VLA requirements and demonstrate minimal stall characteristics. The resulting prototype (designated Eagle 150A) was first flown in March 1988, and was certified in November 1996. The aircraft demonstrated docile stall characteristics, rapid roll rates, 125 knot cruise speed (at 75% power) and crisp handling. After 15 aircraft were built at Fremantle, Western Australia, the Eagle 150B was introduced. Roncz was presented with the Prince's Australian Medal for the design of the Eagle 150 by His Royal Highness Prince Philip at a London ceremony in 2000.

The manufacturing rights to the Eagle 150B are now owned by the Malaysian company Composites Technology Research Malaysia (CTRM).

Eagle Airborne Reconnaissance Vehicle
A development of the aircraft as an unmanned aerial vehicle has been designated the Eagle ARV System. The first system, consisting of three aircraft and a ground station, has been purchased by the Malaysian government and other 20 on order.
 The unmanned or manned version of 150 is being used by the Royal Malaysian Air Force for aerial surveillance operations for environmental and fire control. Specifications are identical to the Eagle 150 other than the ability for the aircraft to be remotely flown.

Variants
Eagle X-TS Initial design by Neil Graham and his father Deryck Graham.
Eagle 150Productionised version of the XT-S, built by Eagle Aircraft.
Eagle 150BFurther development of the 150
CTRM Eagle ARV Optionally piloted UAV version of the 150B developed by Eagle Aircraft Pty Ltd/BAE Systems/Composites Technology Research Malaysia (CTRM) for the Malaysian Government.

Specifications (E-150B)

References

 World Directory of Leisure Aviation 2005–2006, ISSN 1368-485X

External links

 CRTM (Composites Technology Research Malaysia 
 CASA Australia Type Certificate
 FAA Type Certificate
 New Zealand Type Acceptance Report 
 TCM IO-240 Type Certificate Data Sheet
 McCauley 1A135 Type Certificate Data Sheet

Aircraft manufactured in Australia
1990s Australian civil utility aircraft
Unmanned aerial vehicles of Australia
Aircraft manufactured in Malaysia
Three-surface aircraft
Aircraft first flown in 1997